The 1914–15 Georgia Bulldogs basketball team represents the University of Georgia during the 1914–15 college men's basketball season. The team captain of the 1914–15 season was Louis Lester.

Schedule

|-

References

Georgia Bulldogs basketball seasons
Georgia
Bulldogs
Bulldogs